John Michael may refer to:

 John Michael (darts player) (born 1974), Greek-Cypriot darts player
 John Michael (politician), American politician
 John Michael (broadcaster) (born 1972), American sports broadcaster

See also
Jack Michael (born 1926), researcher, professor and author

John Michaels (1907–1996), pitcher in Major League Baseball